DeLand Southwest is an unincorporated census-designated place located in Volusia County, Florida, United States. The population was 1,056 at the 2020 census.

Geography
DeLand Southwest is located at  (29.009037, -81.309675).

Demographics

As of the census of 2000, there were 1,169 people, 387 households, and 258 families residing in the CDP.  The population density was 716.4/km2 (1,862.9/mi2).  There were 459 housing units at an average density of 281.3/km2 (731.4/mi2).  The racial makeup of the town was 25.15% White, 70.66% African American, 0.09% Native American, 0.43% Asian, 2.57% from other races, and 1.11% from two or more races. Hispanic or Latino of any race were 7.19% of the population.

There were 387 households, out of which 29.5% had children under the age of 18 living with them, 33.3% were married couples living together, 30.0% had a female householder with no husband present, and 33.1% were non-families. 26.6% of all households were made up of individuals, and 8.0% had someone living alone who was 65 years of age or older.  The average household size was 2.73 and the average family size was 3.32.

In the CDP, the population was spread out, with 26.8% under the age of 18, 7.8% from 18 to 24, 23.8% from 25 to 44, 21.3% from 45 to 64, and 20.4% who were 65 years of age or older.  The median age was 38 years. For every 100 females, there were 79.0 males.  For every 100 females age 18 and over, there were 68.8 males.

The median income for a household in the CDP was $13,090, and the median income for a family was $18,929. Males had a median income of $17,083 versus $17,417 for females. The per capita income for the town was $8,373.  About 41.9% of families and 45.7% of the population were below the poverty line, including 50.9% of those under age 18 and 43.7% of those age 65 or over.

References

Census-designated places in Volusia County, Florida
Census-designated places in Florida